"Ghetto Supastar (That Is What You Are)" is a song by American rapper Pras, featuring rapper Ol' Dirty Bastard and R&B singer Mýa. It was released on June 6, 1998. The track samples Kenny Rogers and Dolly Parton's 1983 single "Islands in the Stream" and was produced by Wyclef Jean and Jerry 'Wonda" Duplessis for Pras' debut solo studio album, Ghetto Supastar. It was also featured on the soundtrack for the 1998 film Bulworth.

Background
The song's writers are Prakazrel Michel, Wyclef Jean, Russell Jones, Barry Gibb, Robin Gibb, and Maurice Gibb.

The song was released on June 6, 1998 in the United States. The single was a commercial success; it peaked at number 15 for five consecutive weeks on the Billboard Hot 100 and number eight on Billboards Hot R&B/Hip Hop Songs. The single was certified platinum in the United States by Recording Industry Association of America. "Ghetto Supastar" was a critical and commercial success worldwide, peaking at number two in the UK, Sweden, and Australia, number four in Spain, number nine in Canada, as well as topping the charts in eight countries. In 1999, the song received a nomination for Best Rap Performance by a Duo or Group at the 41st Grammy Awards. There was a non-album remix version of the song that was performed live many times with Canibus.

According to Pras, the song was originally intended to be a collaboration only between himself and Mya. Ol' Dirty Bastard was in the same building, recording with Sunz of Man and mistakenly burst into the studio where Pras and Mya were setting up. Ol' Dirty Bastard heard the song and asked to be part of it, to which Pras agreed.

Critical reception
David Browne for Entertainment Weekly wrote, "A rising hit from the Bulworth soundtrack, this left-field remake of the Kenny Rogers-Dolly Parton hit “Islands in the Stream” is a far better showcase for Mya; with her buttery rendering of the song’s hooky chorus, she paints herself as the world’s most streetwise, levelheaded groupie. As for the rest of the track, its combination of slinky guitar, scratching, and scratchy ODB growl (or is that now “scratchy Big Baby Jesus growl”?) makes it a dozen times more fun than Bulworth itself."

Music video
Francis Lawrence directed the video, which features actress Halle Berry and actors Warren Beatty, Oliver Platt, and Joshua Malina. In a play on the theme of the film, which is a prominent white politician acting like a Black American, Bulworth in the music video begins to stretch his mouth, revealing himself to be Pras in a mask, who has just become the first African-American U.S. president. Shortly after Pras gets pushed in an elevator, he takes off his suit and performs. Wyclef Jean also appears on the set playing the bass guitar riff at the end of the song. It was nominated for an MTV Video Music Award for Best Rap Video and Best Video from a Film. Another three nominations on the 1998 Billboard Video Music Awards for Best New Artist Clip (Pop), Best New Artist Clip (Rap), and Best New Artist Clip (R&B). It won an 8th Annual MVPA Award in 1999.

Bee Gees' recorded version
The Bee Gees recorded a version of "Islands in the Stream" with the chorus of "Ghetto Supastar" replacing the final chorus for their retrospective 2001 compilation Their Greatest Hits: The Record. It also appeared on their 2004 Number Ones and on the 2010 Mythology box set.

Cover versions
"Weird Al" Yankovic included the song in his polka medley "Polka Power!" from his 1999 album Running with Scissors.

In August 2011, Taylor Swift covered "Ghetto Supastar" during the North American leg of her Speak Now World Tour. In each city, she chose to pay tribute to a homegrown artist. In Washington, D.C., she performed an acoustic version of "Ghetto Supastar", given that Mýa is from Washington, D.C. Swift referred to the song as her "seventh grade anthem".

In 2017, singer/actress Vanessa Hudgens posted a video of herself singing "Ghetto Supastar" a capella on Instagram.

Track listing
 German CD single
 "Ghetto Supastar" (Main Version) - 4:26
 "Ghetto Supastar" (Instrumental) - 4:26
 "Ghetto Supastar" (Acapella) - 4:08
 "Don't Be Afraid" (performed by Mýa) - 4:48
 UK CD single
 "Ghetto Supastar" (Main Version) - 4:26
 "Ghetto Supastar" (Instrumental) - 4:26
 "Don't Be Afraid" (performed by Mýa) - 4:48
 12" vinyl
 "Ghetto Supastar" (Main Version) - 4:26
 "Ghetto Supastar" (TV Mix) - 4:26
 "Ghetto Supastar" (Instrumental) - 4:26
 "Ghetto Supastar" (Acapella) - 4:08

Personnel
Written by P. Michel, W. Jean, B. Gibb, M. Gibb, R. Gibb, J. Brown, B. Byrd, R. Lenhoff
Contains a sample from "Under the Influence of Love" by Love Unlimited
Contains an interpolation of "Islands In The Stream" by the Bee Gees and samples "Get Up, Get Into It, Get Involved" by James Brown
Taken from the soundtrack of Bulworth
Engineered by Chris Theis and Phil Blackman
Soundtrack executive producer: Karyn Rachtman
Original sound recordings owned by Interscope Records
Universal Music (UK) Ltd. are exclusive licensees for the United Kingdom
Distributed by BMG Records (UK) Ltd.
Pras appears courtesy of Refugee Camp Entertainment / RuffHouse / Columbia Records
ODB appears courtesy of Elektra Entertainment Group
Mýa appears courtesy of University Music Entertainment / Interscope

Charts

Weekly charts

Year-end charts

Certifications

References

External links
Pras discography
Fugees historyline
[ Allmusic charts]

1998 songs
1998 singles
Pras songs
Mýa songs
Ol' Dirty Bastard songs
Number-one singles in Austria
Number-one singles in Denmark
European Hot 100 Singles number-one singles
Number-one singles in Germany
Irish Singles Chart number-one singles
Dutch Top 40 number-one singles
Number-one singles in Norway
Number-one singles in Switzerland
Interscope Records singles
Music videos directed by Francis Lawrence
Songs written for films
Songs written by Pras
Songs written by Wyclef Jean
Songs written by Barry Gibb
Songs written by Maurice Gibb
Songs written by Robin Gibb